Twelve teams qualify for women's rugby sevens at the 2020 Summer Olympics . Japan automatically qualifies as host, with the top four teams of the 2018–19 World Rugby Women's Sevens Series securing their spots. Afterwards, qualification is determined with each of the six continental confederations determining a representative, and the remaining qualification spot determined through an international sevens tournament to be determined.

Table

 Notes:

2018–19 World Rugby Women's Sevens Series

As a principal route for the tournament, four places were determined by performance in the series over six tournaments.

 Notes:

Africa

Rugby Africa held the 2019 Africa Women's Sevens on 12–13 October 2019 at Jemmal, Tunisia. With South Africa declining their Olympic qualification spot, Kenya advanced to the Olympic tournament.

Pool A

Pool B

Pool C

Knockout Round

Asia

Asia Rugby held a tournament on 9–10 November 2019 in Guangzhou, China. Japan, already qualified for the Olympics as the host country, did not enter. China won the tournament and gained direct qualification.

Pool A

Pool B

Knockout round

Europe

Rugby Europe held a tournament on 13–14 July 2019 in Kazan, Russia. 
England won the tournament, meaning that Great Britain qualified for the Olympics.

Teams eligible to compete in the tournament included:
 The top seven placed Olympic teams in the 2019 Marcoussis Women's Sevens, with England representing Great Britain
 The top four placed teams in the 2019 Rugby Europe Women's Sevens Trophy
 The 2019 Rugby Europe Women's Sevens Conference winner

Pool A

Pool B

Pool C

Knockout stage

North America

Rugby Americas North held the 2019 RAN Women's Sevens on 6–7 July 2019 at George Town, Cayman Islands. With the United States and Canada both qualifying through the Women's Sevens Series, the first and second placed teams Jamaica and Mexico advanced to the final qualifying tournament.

Oceania

Oceania Rugby held the 2019 Oceania Women's Sevens Championship on 7–9 November 2019 at Suva, Fiji.  With Australia and New Zealand already qualified through the Women's Sevens Series, Fiji gained direct qualification to the Olympics while Papua New Guinea and Samoa advanced to the final qualifying tournament.

Pool B

Pool C

Knockout stage

South America

Sudamérica Rugby held a tournament on 1–2 June 2019 in Lima, Peru. Brazil won direct qualification to the Olympics while the second and third placed teams Colombia and Argentina advanced to the final qualifying tournament.

Pool A

Pool B

Knockout

Olympic qualification event

A 12-team repechage tournament was scheduled to be held from 20–21 June 2020, but was postponed due to the COVID-19 pandemic. A new venue and date for the tournament has yet to be announced. Two runners-up from each of the six continental qualification tournaments will play, with the winner and runner-up advancing to the Olympic tournament.

 Notes:

See also
Rugby sevens at the 2020 Summer Olympics – Men's qualification

References

 
qualification
Women